Peganum L.  is a genus under the recently separated family Nitrariaceae.  Formerly it used to be included in the family Zygophyllaceae.

Phylogeny and Species
The genus has around five species, occurring in warm temperate to subtropical regions across the world:
 Peganum harmala L. (Harmal or Syrian rue) — Mediterranean region east to China
 Peganum mexicanum Gray — Mexico
 Peganum multisectum (Maxim.) Bobrov — China, Mongolia
 Peganum nigellastrum Bunge — China
 Peganum texanum M.E.Jones — southern North America

Phylogenetic data suggests the following relationships:

References

Nitrariaceae